Elier Pozo Ballona (born 28 January 1995) is a Cuban footballer who plays as a goalkeeper for Navegantes.

Career
In 2021, Pozo signed for Brazilian sixth division side Navegantes.

References

External links
 
 

Living people
1995 births
Cuban footballers
Cuba international footballers
Association football goalkeepers
FC Camagüey players
FC Pinar del Río players
Cuban expatriate footballers
Expatriate footballers in Brazil
People from Consolación del Sur
Cuba under-20 international footballers
2015 CONCACAF U-20 Championship players